Big Bad Bo is the 18th studio album by musician Bo Diddley released by the Chess label in 1974.

Reception

Allmusic awarded the album 2 stars with reviewer Bruce Eder stating "Having tried everything else in his search for a new sound, Bo moved into a jazz vein on this record, and the results are not bad, but not they're not really Bo, either. ... For the first time, the Bo Diddley beat appears nowhere on one of his albums".

Track listing 
 "Bite You" (Tammi McDaniel, Terri Lynn) – 4:20
 "He's Got All the Whiskey" (Bobby Charles) – 4:40
 "Hit or Miss" (Odetta F. Gordon) – 3:40
 "You've Got a Lot of Nerve" (Connie Redmond, Kay McDaniel) – 3:23
 "Stop the Pusher" (Kay McDaniel) – 5:15
 "Evelee" (Ellas McDaniel) – 6:23
 "I've Been Workin'" (Van Morrison) – 4:50

Personnel 
Bo Diddley – vocals, guitar
Joe Newman, John Bello, Jon Faddis, Irvin Markowitz, Marvin Stamm – trumpet
Dominick Gravine, Garnett Brown, Harry DiVito – trombone
Tony Price – tuba
Willis Jackson – tenor saxophone
John Leone – baritone saxophone
Michael Pickett – harmonica
Carl Lynch, John Tropea – guitar
Ernest Hayes – electric piano
Wilbur Bascomb Jr. – electric bass
Jimmy Johnson Jr. – drums
Esmond Edwards, Montego Joe – percussion
J. R. Bailey, Ken Williams, Melvin Kent – backing vocals
Wade Marcus – horn arrangement and conducting
Gene Bianco – conductor

References 

1974 albums
Chess Records albums
Bo Diddley albums
Albums produced by Esmond Edwards
Albums arranged by Wade Marcus